Marsdenia suaveolens, commonly known as the scented milk vine, is a small vine found in New South Wales, Australia. It is found in a variety of habitats in relatively high rainfall areas, from Bega to Port Macquarie. The original specimen was collected at Sydney on 11 May 1802.

Taxonomy
The species name suaveolens is from Latin, and it refers to the uniquely sweet scented flowers. In 1810, this species first appeared in scientific literature, in the Prodromus Florae Novae Hollandiae, authored by the prolific Scottish botanist, Robert Brown. Kurt Sprengel placed it in the genus Pergularia in 1824.

Description

Marsdenia suaveolens grows as a vine in forest or small upright shrub in heathland, reaching 1 m (3 ft) high. The plant exudes a white milky sap when cut or damaged. The (oppositely arranged) leaves arise in pairs off the stem. The leaf margins roll downwards. They are arranged in umbels. Fruiting takes place 2–3 months after flowering. They open to release the feathery seeds from August to January. The seeds are then blown away by the wind.

Distribution and habitat
The species ranges from Port Macquarie to Bega in eastern New South Wales. It grows in wet sclerophyll forest in association with such species as turpentine (Syncarpia glomulifera), Sydney peppermint (Eucalyptus piperita) and blackbutt (E. pilularis), generally on sandy alluvial soils. It is also found in dry sclerophyll forest with red bloodwood (Corymbia gummifera), stiff-leaf wattle (Acacia obtusifolia) and paperbark tea-tree (Leptospermum trinervium), and can be found in rainforest gullies. The yearly rainfall is over 800 mm.

Ecology
Marsdenia suaveolens resprouts after bushfire, and has been recorded setting fruit five months after a burn.

Marsdenia suaveolens is foraged upon by caterpillars of the common crow (Euploea core)

Cultivation
In 1820, The Botanical Register reported that Marsdenia suaveolens flowered in the United Kingdom in Colville Nursery in Chelsea. The flower's fragrance was greatly praised and compared to that of Heliotropium peruvianum (now Heliotropium arborescens). It can be grown in well-drained soil in a spot with some shelter in the garden.

References

Marsdenia
Flora of New South Wales
Plants described in 1810
Vines